Katsina may refer to:

Katsina State, a state in northern Nigeria
Katsina, a city and the capital of Katsina State
Katsina Airport, an airport in Katsina
Katsina University, a private Islamic university in Katsina
Katsina-Ala, a Local Government Area (LGA) of Benue State, Nigeria
Katsina, Estonia, a village in Estonia